Seneca College of Applied Arts and Technology is a multiple-campus public college in the Greater Toronto Area, and Peterborough, Ontario, Canada regions. It offers full-time and part-time programs at the baccalaureate, diploma, certificate and graduate levels.

History

Seneca opened in 1967 as part of a provincial initiative to establish an Ontario-wide network of colleges of applied arts and technology providing career-oriented diploma and certificate courses as well as continuing education programs to Ontario communities.  The province was responding to the increasing need for sophisticated applied learning as technology continued to change the nature of work and the provincial economy. General education was considered an important element in postsecondary education, and breadth courses continue to be a part of every program.  In 2001 the colleges were granted the ability to offer baccalaureate degrees.  Seneca is one of five colleges that can offer up to 15 per cent of its program activity at the degree level.

Campuses
Seneca has campus locations throughout the Greater Toronto Area and in Peterborough.

Newnham Campus

The Newnham Campus is one of the largest college campuses in Canada. It is home to more than 15,000 full-time students in business, engineering, aviation, early childhood education, fashion, opticianry, information and communications technology and liberal arts. The campus, initially known as Finch Campus, was renamed in 1984 after founding president William T. Newnham, is also the site of extensive continuing education activity during the evenings and weekends. The campus also includes a 1,113-bed residence, sports centre and daycare centre.  It is located west of the intersection of Highway 404 and Finch Avenue East .

The campus's first building was opened in 1969 and over the years has involved various architects (William H.D. Hurst (Phase 1); John B. Parkin (Phase 2 with Searle, Wilbee and Rowland); Abram, Nowski and McLaughlin (arena)). In 1973 a 1,100 square foot domed planetarium was added to the Phase 3 section of the campus, but it has since closed.

In fall 2011, a major 200,000-square-foot expansion, designed for energy efficiency and environmental sustainability, was officially opened at the campus. The new building, designed by Craig Applegath of Dialog, features: three 80-seat classrooms; twenty-three 40-seat classrooms; fourteen 40-seat computer labs; a multi-purpose auditorium for 240 students that can be turned into a conference room or two 120-seat lecture halls; increased computing commons and library space; several new areas of collaborative student study and work space; a new "front door" for the campus and improved campus access for people with disabilities. The atrium in the new space was named after Frederick Minkler, Seneca's first chair of the board of governors .

In 2019, Seneca's Centre for Innovation, Technology and Entrepreneurship (CITE) opened at Newnham Campus, representing a major expansion to the campus. CITE includes Seneca's innovation centre known as HELIX, major technology labs for mechatronics and robotics courses as well as extensive computer labs and classrooms. CITE is infused with Indigenous design, the highlight of which is a 30-foot diameter medallion in terrazzo rendered from an original work by Joseph Sagaj.

Seneca @ York

Seneca @ York Campus, located on York University's Keele Campus, features the Stephen E. Quinlan Building, designed by architect Raymond Moriyama and named after Seneca's third president Steve Quinlan.  Seneca also shares the Victor Phillip Dahdaleh Building (formerly known as TEL building) with York. Several schools are located at this Toronto campus, including the Schools of Creative Arts and Animation, Media, Biological Sciences & Applied Chemistry, English & Liberal Studies and Legal, Public and Office 
Administration.

King Campus

It is home to full and part-time programs in Applied Arts, Health Sciences and Community Services; which include Public Safety, Nursing, Social Service Worker, Child and Youth Care, Behavioural Sciences, Early Childhood Education, Environmental Landscape Management, Recreation and Leisure Services, Underwater Skills, and Veterinary Assistant and Veterinary Technician. There is a residence for Seneca students on campus. Seneca Residence is a suite-style building for about 230 students with amenities such as a lounge, laundry room, and a common kitchen.

One of the most striking and historically significant features of King Campus is Eaton Hall, the former summer home of the Eaton Family, which sits on the shores of Lake Seneca. 
Eaton Hall was the former home of Seneca's Management Development Centre, and has also been the setting of several films, including David Cronenberg's A History of Violence, Mrs. Winterbourne, The House by the Lake, and others.

In June 2011, the Government of Ontario announced a $43 million project to expand services at the campus, including a new building with 25 classrooms, a library, computer services, and health care training laboratories. The project eventually became known as Magna Hall, a 200,000 square foot facility that officially opened on 27 September 2018. Named in recognition of a significant gift from Magna International, it includes 25 classrooms, computer labs, specialty labs, a library, a student centre and a multi-purpose athletic and recreation space.

A  parcel of the campus at the northwest corner of Dufferin Street and 15th Sideroad will house a community centre for King City. The township of King will lease the land for $1 per year for 99 years.

Markham Campus

Markham Campus opened its doors in 2005, becoming the first post-secondary education facility in the city of Markham, Ontario. The campus houses full and part-time programs in the areas of business, marketing and tourism, and also the college's departments of Finance, Human Resources and Information Technology Services. Since 2011 the campus has also been home to the Confucius Institute.

In 2020, Seneca International Academy (SIA) was established within Markham Campus to give international students an opportunity to obtain world-class education and to meet the increasing demand for Canadian education. The academy also offers dedicated services tailored for international students.

Peterborough Campus
Peterborough Airport in Peterborough is the home of Seneca's aviation campus, including a fleet of aircraft and flight training devices used by students enrolled in the Bachelor of Aviation Program. Opened in January 2014, in response to the pending closure of Buttonville Airport, the campus serves the second, third and fourth years of the degree program, while first-year students study at Newnham Campus. Some courses and services at the Peterborough Campus are offered in partnership with Fleming College.

As of February 2023, Seneca's fleet consists of 21 aircraft: 17 Cessna 172, the 172S model, (8 Garmin G1000 equipped) and 4 Beechcraft Barons (2 G1000 equipped). The operate as ICAO airline designator BZQ, and telephony STING.

Seneca Downtown
Opened in October 2019 and located in Downtown Toronto, Seneca Downtown provides a mix of in-class, online and hybrid courses for post-secondary graduates and working professionals.

Yorkgate Campus
Open since the 1990s, Yorkgate Campus has post-secondary programs as well as customized programs in academic upgrading. Serving as an access and outreach centre for the Jane-Finch community, Yorkgate also offers a variety of post-secondary programs including since 2013 Practical Nursing and Social Service Worker. The facility is located on the second floor of the Yorkgate Mall at Finch Avenue West and Jane Street in Toronto.

Former locations
Seneca's first homes from 1967 to 1969 were various buildings in North York:
 Sheppard Campus at 43 Sheppard Avenue East, a converted factory; the college vacated it for Newnham Campus, and the site is now a low-rise office tower.
 Several North York Board of Education offices
 A Woolworth store at Sheppard Avenue East and Yonge Street; the strip mall was demolished and is now the site of a condo development, Hullmark Centre.
 Lewis S. Beattie Secondary School (now École secondaire catholique Mgr-de-Charbonnel of the Conseil scolaire de district catholique Centre-Sud) at Drewy Avenue west of Yonge Street

Other former Seneca College campuses include: 
 Jane Campus home to Seneca's Centre for Advanced Technologies. Students studying at the campus pursue careers in the areas of Tool Design, Computer Numerical Control (CNC), and Metals Machining Trades such as Tool & Die Maker and Mould Maker. The building is located at 21 Beverly Hills Drive in Toronto and can be seen from the westbound collector lanes of Highway 401. Seneca's Jane Campus closed in May 2019.
 Vaughan Campus officially opened its doors on 28 January 2011 at 1490 Major Mackenzie Drive West, in Vaughan. It offered services including academic upgrading, employment services and workplace essential skills training for professionals, as well as a centre for entrepreneurship. The campus closed in March 2020.
 Newmarket Campus offered Employment Ontario services and access to resources and information. Programs at this location included employment counseling, job search workshops, job development services, and computer skills training. Academic upgrading was offered in the day and evening. The campus was located in Nature's Emporium Plaza, 16655 Yonge St. in Newmarket.
 Yorkdale Campus on Dufferin Street south of Lawrence Avenue West in North York was home to the Travel and Tourism program from the 1980s to 2000. Formerly C.B. Parsons Junior High, it is now home to Fieldstone Day School. The building was owned by the North York Board of Education and is now owned by the Toronto District School Board.
 Markham Information Centre located at the northeast corner of McCowan Road and Highway 7. The office later relocated to 6061 Highway 7 east of Markham Road (Employment and Community Services).
 Buttonville Campus located at the Buttonville Airport housed Seneca's aviation program from 1968 to 2013. The aviation program later relocated to Peterborough Airport.
 Don Mills Campus located in a former IBM building at 1380 Don Mills Road in North York. Don Mills Campus opened in 1991 and housed the School of Computer Studies and Financial Services Department. 
 Gordon Baker Campus located at 155 Gordon Baker Drive, Unit 102. Gordon Baker Campus opened in the early 1990s and was home to Seneca's real estate program. Computer training was also offered.
 Caledonia Campus located at 1200 Lawrence Avenue West in Toronto. Caledonia Campus opened in 1986 and offered English as a Second Language and summer language programs. Caledonia once housed Seneca's English Language Institute. 
 Fairmeadow Campus located at 17 Fairmeadow Avenue in North York. Fairmeadow Campus housed many of Seneca's administrative functions including accounting, purchasing, personnel and media services. Fairmeadow was also home to Seneca's Suzuki School of Music which instructed students in the Suzuki Method. Formerly Fairmeadow PS.
 School of Communication Arts located at 1124 Finch Avenue West in North York. The School of Communication Arts opened in the Fall of 1987 and was dedicated entirely to creative and communication arts. 
 Dufferin Campus located at 1000 Finch Avenue West in Downsview. Dufferin Campus opened on 8 September 1975 and was the headquarters of the Business and Industrial Training Division. The campus also housed facilities for the Dental Hygiene and Dental Assistant programs.

Academics

Seneca offers more than 145 full-time programs and 135 part-time programs including 14 Bachelor's degrees and 30 graduate certificates.

Many programs offer experiential learning opportunities such as co-op, placements, internships and community service options, and some include a mandatory co-op period prior to graduation. Seneca also offers career search assistance to graduating students. Seneca College programs are developed and kept current with the assistance of advisory committees made up of industry members.

Seneca College has more than 70 transfer agreements with both local and international post-secondary institutions, including universities in Australia, England, South Africa and the U.S. These agreements allow students to apply their college education to obtain credit towards a university degree.

Faculties, Schools and Centres
Applied Arts & Health Sciences
 Animal Health
 Community Services
 Early Childhood Education
 English and Liberal Studies
 Health Sciences
 Public Safety and Police Studies
 Recreation
 Underwater Skills

Applied Science & Engineering Technology

 Aviation
 Biological Sciences & Applied Chemistry
 Centre for Advanced Technologies
 Centre for the Built Environment
 Information Technology Administration and Security
 English and Liberal Studies
 Fire Protection
 Software Design and Data Science
 York/Seneca Institute for Mathematics, Science, and Technology Education

Business

 Accounting & Financial Services
 Business Management
 Centre for Financial Services
 Centre for Human Resources
 English and Liberal Studies
 International Business
 Legal and Public Administration/Office Administration
 Tourism
 Fintech

Communication, Art & Design
 Animation Arts Centre
 Creative Arts and Animation
 English and Liberal Studies
 Fashion
 Marketing
 Media

Arts
 Arts and Science
 English Language Institute
 English and Liberal Studies

Continuing Education
 Business
 Community
 Creative
 Education
 Environment
 Humanities
 Language
 Technology

Seneca Libraries
Seneca libraries offer print, audiovisual and electronic resources including books, magazines, journals, videos, DVDs, slides, recordings and a variety of topical databases. A high percentage of the collection is now digital. Services include research support, library instruction and a large circulating collection. The libraries provide online help through e-mail and the live reference chat services, "AskUS" and "askON". The Seneca Libraries' website also hosts research guides tailored to program-specific offerings. The library facilities are located at the Newnham, York University, Markham and King campuses and offer facilities for group and individual study and electronic training centers, the Sandbox, and workstations equipped with instructional software and information resources tailored to course requirements.

Seneca Archives and Special Collections 

Seneca Archives and Special Collections identifies, preserves, and makes available for use the documentary heritage of Seneca College of Applied Arts and Technology. This area of the college collects inactive records of long-term value produced by Seneca's departments and other services, as well as the records of individuals and organizations closely associated with the college. Seneca Archives and Special Collections holdings consist of textual records, graphic records, sound and moving image records, architectural drawings, publications, artifacts, and more. The Archives' resources are open to all members of the College community and outside researchers for the purposes of research, teaching, publication, television and radio programs, and for general interest.

International
Seneca has been active in international education for decades and now attracts about 10,000 international students each year from about 130 countries. Seneca's English Language Institute prepares international students for post-secondary study through intensive language training that can last anywhere from two months to more than a year. The college has several partnerships with overseas institutions and is expanding its activities in joint applied research and work/study abroad options.

Residence

Seneca College currently offers residence at both the Newnham Campus and the King Campus. Seneca residences are composed of suite-style units containing two bedrooms, a bathroom and kitchenette. Each bedroom contains a double bed, desk, chair, closet and dresser space, as well as cable TV, internet access and phone. Students also have access to a common kitchen, laundry rooms, lounge areas, a games room and a convenience store. Buildings have a front desk and 24-hour video monitoring, and are accessed by swipe card. The King Campus residence houses 233 students in a three-storey low-rise structure, while the Newnham Campus residence houses 1,113 students in a high-rise tower with a dining hall, convenience store, and restaurant all within the building. Seneca College Residence have organized a free shuttle service from the Newnham Campus to the Markham, Seneca@York and King campuses.

Athletics

The school's athletic teams are named "The Sting". The Seneca Sting is one of the most-decorated athletic programs in the history of the Ontario Colleges Athletic Association (OCAA), having won more than 450 medals since 1967. Seneca has sixteen varsity sports teams, including Badminton, Baseball, Basketball, Cross Country, Curling, Fastball, Golf, Rugby, Soccer, and Volleyball, for both male and female student athletes. The Seneca Sports Centre located at the Newnham Campus includes a full ice arena, a triple gymnasium, six tennis courts, a softball diamond, two beach volleyball courts, a soccer field, and a fitness center with a dance studio.  Seneca College also offers various fields, gymnasiums and fitness equipment at other campuses.

Concerts
Seneca hosted a number of concerts in the 1970s and 1980s at the Minkler Auditorium and Seneca Field House (both at Newnham Campus). Monty Python's Flying Circus performed at the Minkler Auditorium on their 1st Canadian tour in 1973. The Grateful Dead performed at Seneca College's Field House on 2 November 1977. Other famous artists who performed in the late seventies and eighties at Seneca include Patti Smith, Bruce Springsteen (in one of his first Canadian appearances), David Bowie, Thin Lizzy (1977), Graham Parker, Sparks (band), Teenage Head, Max Webster (1977), and Iggy Pop.

Notable people

Alumni
 Enza Anderson – Political activist and media personality
 Bobby Ash – Children's TV host
 Mathis Bailey — novelist and writer
 Lyriq Bent – Actor
 Rachel Bonnetta – Canadian sports presenter
 Boris Cherniak – Entertainer
 Al Connelly – Musician
 Alvin Curling – Canadian former diplomat and former Liberal MPP
 Dini Dimakos – Stand-up comedian
 Dan Harris – Politician
 Geraldine Heaney – Hockey player and coach
 Angela James – Hockey player; one of the first two women inducted into the Hockey Hall of Fame
 Chuck (Spider) Jones – Broadcaster
 Rukhsana Khan – Author, writer, storyteller
 Wiz Kilo – Hip-hop artist
 P. J. Marcellino – Documentary Filmmaker
 Vivienne Poy – Fashion designer and Canadian Senator
 Brian Price – Canadian Olympic Rowing Team
 Nathan Lloyd Smith – soldier 
 Hodan Nalayeh – media executive and entrepreneur
 Evanka Osmak – Sports Anchor
 Beverly Thomson – Host of Canada AM
 Yasmin Warsame – Model 
 Jason Chan – Hong Kong pop singer, entertainer
 Bill Welychka – Former MuchMusic and MuchMoreMusic personality, now weather anchor

Faculty
 Nanda Lwin – Music historian, author, journalist, and professor of civil engineering technology
 Paula Todd – Journalist, author, and professor of broadcast journalism and digital media
 Jamie Zeppa – Writer
 Hershell Ezrin – Public affairs specialist
 Chris Szalwinski - Researcher,C++ Standard Member

Presidents
 William Thomson Newnham 1966–1984
 W. Roy McCutcheon 1984–1992
 Steve Quinlan 1992–2001
 Rick Miner 2001–2009
 David Agnew 2009–present

See also
 Higher education in Ontario
 List of colleges in Ontario
 The Spine, a computer-animated short by Chris Landreth created with Seneca College animators

References

External links

 
 Official athletic website

 
Universities and colleges in Toronto
Educational institutions established in 1967
Education in Toronto
Colleges in Ontario
1967 establishments in Ontario